Turnstyle are an indie rock band from Perth,  in Western Australia. They are known for their use of cheap Casio keyboards, jazz instruments and lo-fi recording techniques.

Biography

Turnstyle are an Australian indie-rock band formed in 1995 by Adem Kerimovski (aka Adem K) and Paul Fanning. Fanning is related to actor Jackie Coogan, Uncle Fester from The Addams Family. The other members being Todd Griffiths and Dean Davies. They broke up in 2002 and reunited in 2010. By 1997 their second release took them from obscurity to the band of choice on line-ups and supports in mere months. In 1998, to support their EP "Seasides", they embarked on their first Australian tour and featured on ABC Television's 'Recovery'. A change in drummer reinvigorating the band, writing 30 songs in 6 months. They recorded their debut album Turnstyle Country in 1998/99 as a self-funded, unsigned band, eventually signing to Spunk! Records after being turned down by Sony for being too weird. The first single "Spray Water On The Stereo" gained monumental airplay and TV coverage, Reaching 16 on the ARIA alternative charts. The band toured throughout the year, joining Trans Am on tour and playing the Glenworth Valley Weekender. Over the next two years, shows included a tour with Guided By Voices and supporting their heroes Yo La Tengo. In 1999 their song, 'Spray Water on the Stereo' was featured on the hottest 100 as number 94.

Spent musically, in the face of a changing industry and personal circumstances, the band managed one more album, Turnstyle Corporation in 2001 shortly before announcing a break from live performance and recording. Two sold-out shows heralded what became an 8-year break. The band reunited in 2010, then again in 2013 as a permanent reunion. They released the album Time Equals Function in 2015, mixed and mastered in London by Andy Ramsay of Stereolab. In 2018 Turnstyle released Happy Factories, a crisp record that eschewed pedestrian themes for more contemplative subject matter. The album features vocals by Pavement's Bob Nastanovich on one song.

In 2020 the band prepared a compilation of their Casiotone-heavy material as a musical companion to their inclusion in the Western Australian Museum Boola Bardip for their innovative creative process. They are represented by a replica of their late 90s stage set up featuring 3 keyboards attached to an ironing board. The compilation "Key Note Speaker" was released by Valve Records, home to Regurgitator, Shonen Knife and others. During this time and amidst the COVID-19 pandemic in Western Australia, the band began recording a new album, releasing two singles "We Ran with the Pack" in 2021 and "Plain & Simple" in 2023. The album has yet to find release.

The band continues to play live shows in Australia.

Discography

Albums
 Turnstyle Country – Spunk! (1999)
 Turnstyle Corporation – Spunk! (22 October 2001)
 Time Equals Function – Igloo (4 December 2015)
 Happy Factories – Igloo (1 December 2018)

EPs
 Turnstyle (cassette) – Igloo Records (September 1995)
 Itcheekneesonchee (cassette) – Igloo Records (February 1997) – initially limited to 100 copies but followed by multiple pressings
 Seasides – Shock Records (November 1997)
 Sad Rambo – Igloo Records (May 2002), limited to 100 copies

Singles
 "Spray Water on the Stereo" / "Manhattan" – Spunk! (1999) – AUS No. 86
 "Purple Crown" – Igloo Records (1999)
 "I'm a Bus" – Igloo Records (2000)
 "Portamento" – Spunk! (2000)
 "World Famous in Perth" – Spunk! (2001)

Compilations
 Geek Party – Igloo Records (2000)
 Colour Me In Vol 1 – Igloo Records (April 2013), limited to 50 copies – a collection of old demo recordings to commemorate the 2013 reunion
 Colour Me In Vol 2 – Igloo Records (July 2014), limited to 50 copies – a further collection of demo and outtake recordings
 Colour Me In Vol 3 – Igloo Records (April 2020), digital only – a collection of demo and outtake recordings post 2013 reunion
 Key Note Speaker – Valve Records (March 2021), vinyl - conceived to complement the band's inclusion in the Western Australian Museum

References

External links 
 Facebook Page
 Official Website and Store

Western Australian musical groups
Australian indie rock groups